Edge of Sanity is a 1989 American slasher film directed by Gérard Kikoïne and starring Anthony Perkins. It mixes elements of Robert Louis Stevenson's 1886 novella Strange Case of Dr Jekyll and Mr Hyde with those of tales of Jack the Ripper.

Plot
In the opening scene, Henry Jekyll, a young boy, witnesses his father committing adultery with another woman in a barn. His father catches him and violently whips Henry for spying, scarring him for life and leading to repressed sadomasochistic longings. Many years later, in late 1880s England, the adult Dr. Henry Jekyll is experimenting with the human psyche when he accidentally ingests a mix of ether and cocaine and goes insane. He transforms into the monstrous-looking Edward "Jack the Ripper" Hyde and murders a prostitute who resembles one that he previously met as a child. He begins a killing spree using the mixture that was originally meant to be an anesthetic in order to influence prostitutes and johns to torture and kill each other. The murders gain the attention of a detective from Scotland Yard as well as Jekyll's wife Elisabeth, who begins to suspect where her husband is going at nights.

As "Jack" Hyde, he enlists two assistants to give out his anesthetic drug to distribute among the lower-class population of Whitechapel. One night, after he transforms, Jekyll is followed by Elisabeth to a brothel and then from there to a sadomasochistic threesome at a local abandoned warehouse where both of Hyde's partners go crazy and attempt to kill each other and her. Elisabeth subdues and kills both and gets away, but Hyde follows her back to her house. He breaks in and murders her before transforming back into Dr. Jekyll, thus getting away with everything and enabling him to continue his killing spree.

Cast
Anthony Perkins as Dr. Henry Jekyll / Jack "The Ripper" Hyde
Glynis Barber as Elisabeth Jekyll
Sarah Maur Thorp as Susannah
David Lodge as Underwood
Ben Cole as Johnny
Jill Melford as Flora
Noel Coleman as Egglestone
Briony McRoberts as Ann Underwood
Harry Landis as Coroner
Basil Hoskins as Mr. Bottingham

Production

A few exterior sets were filmed in London. Vincent Canby stated that he thinks the film looks "19th-century atmospheric". While the film is for the most part clearly set in the Victorian era, some of the wardrobe seems deliberately anachronistic and modern, adding to the film's surrealistic ambience.

Alain Silver compared the style of the film to those directed by Ken Russell, based on the way that the films incorporate the supernatural, psychology, and sexual imagery. He also said that the prostitutes "further unsettle the preconceptions of the audience".

The book Marked Women: Prostitutes and Prostitution in the Cinema uses the film as an example of sexual brutality against women in films.

Reception

Vincent Canby wrote in The New York Times that Anthony Perkins "gives a good, funny, if somewhat lopsided performance as the madman of medicine".

TV Guide reviewed the film, giving it 1 out of 4 stars and saying, "EDGE OF SANITY obviously isn't meant to be taken seriously, despite its expensive production values and surrealistic photography—both surprisingly good. But the rest of EDGE OF SANITY (shot mostly in Budapest with some English exteriors) doesn't measure up to its technical proficiency." Leonard Maltin described the film as "Tasteless, pointless, and unpleasant".

References

External links

1989 films
1989 horror films
American slasher films
British slasher films
Films about Jack the Ripper
Dr. Jekyll and Mr. Hyde films
Films shot in London
1980s slasher films
1980s English-language films
1980s American films
1980s British films